The 1935 Balkan Cup was the sixth Balkan Cup football tournament. The national teams of Yugoslavia, Greece, Bulgaria and Romania took part and it was won by Yugoslavia. At the end of the tournament, Yugoslavia were declared winners because of their better goal average (the standard tie-breaker at the time); Bulgaria protested, stating that if the match between Yugoslavia and Romania had finished regularly, the former's goal record might have changed, but after a one-year procedure, the protest was rejected and Yugoslavia remained winners. The host of the tournament was Bulgaria. The top goalscorer was Ljubomir Angelov from Bulgaria with 6 goals which come in the form of two hat-tricks.

Final table

Matches

Match abandoned at 0–2 in the 78th minute due to a thunderstorm

Winner

Statistics

Goalscorers

References

1935
1934–35 in European football
1934–35 in Romanian football
1934–35 in Bulgarian football
1934–35 in Greek football
1934–35 in Yugoslav football